Navashinsky District was an administrative and municipal district (raion) in Nizhny Novgorod Oblast, Russia. It was located in the southwest of the oblast. Its administrative center was the town of Navashino. As of the 2010 Census, the total population of the district was 24,296, with the population of Navashino accounting for 67.6% of that number.

History
The district was established in 1944 and given its present name in 1960. Per Law #66-Z of May 13, 2015, the district was transformed into a town of oblast significance of Navashino. In a similar manner, Law #58-Z of May 8, 2015 abolished Navashinsky Municipal District and transformed it into Navashinsky Urban Okrug.

Administrative and municipal divisions
As of May 2015, the district was administratively divided into one town of district significance (Navashino) and four selsoviets (comprising fifty rural localities). Municipally, Navashinsky Municipal District was divided into one urban settlement and four rural settlements.

References

Notes

Sources

Districts of Nizhny Novgorod Oblast
States and territories established in 1944
States and territories disestablished in 2015